Sikkim National Party was a political party in the Kingdom of Sikkim, formed in 1950. The Sikkim National Party was in favour of the monarchy and advocated independence for Sikkim. The party was founded to counter the growing influence of the pro-Indian parties Sikkim State Congress and Rajya Praja Sammelan, that had been formed after the independence of India in 1947.

In the last elections for the Sikkim State Council before the fall of the monarchy in 1975, NP only won the seat of Kabi-Tingda (the sole seat not won by Dorjee's unified Congress party).

Electoral history

References

Defunct political parties in Sikkim
Political parties established in 1950
1950 establishments in Sikkim
Monarchist parties
Political parties disestablished in 1977